Anna Vladimirovna Litvinova (Russian: Анна Владимировна Литвинова; 1 May 1983 – 22 January 2013) was a Russian fashion model and beauty pageant titleholder. She won the Miss Universe - Russia 2006 beauty contest and represented Russia at  Miss Universe 2006 contest, where she finished in the top 20.

Later she moved to Moscow and started a modelling career. There she helped aspiring models to find work abroad. She died in January 2013 after suffering from cancer for one year.

Biography

Early life 
Litvinova was born and raised in Novokuznetsk. In 2003, she completed her graduations from Kuzbass State Pedagogical Academy, where she studied at the Faculty of Foreign Languages.

Career 
In 2003 Litvinova won the title of the most beautiful woman in the "Miss Kuzbass", and entered the top five on the All-Russian competition of beauty, with the title of "Miss Grace." She became the first runner-up in "Miss Siberia" contest. In 2006 she won Miss Universe - Russia contest and then went to Los Angeles to represent Russia in Miss Universe. She did not win, but finished in the Top 20.

After winning the regional beauty competition of Novokuznetsk, she went to Moscow and started a modelling career. In Moscow she worked as a manager, she was organizing competitions and helping models to find work abroad. There she worked as second degree designer too. About her life in Moscow, Litvinova said "Moscow is a very large, noisy, bustling city. But I got used to it and loved it."

Death 

Litvinova was diagnosed with melanoma about a year prior to her death. She was taken for treatment to a clinic in Germany but died on 22 January 2013 at the age of 29.

Awards 

Here is a list of titles and awards Litvinova won in her career.

References

External links 
 

1983 births
2013 deaths
Date of birth unknown
Deaths from cancer in Germany
Deaths from melanoma
Miss Russia winners
Miss Universe 2006 contestants
People from Novokuznetsk
Russian beauty pageant winners
Russian female models